Miel is a farming village in the municipality Swisttal in the North Rhine-Westphalian Rhein-Sieg district. It is situated approximately 16 km southwest of Bonn. In 2007 it had 1072 inhabitants.

References

External links 
 Website of the municipality Swisttal (German)

Towns in North Rhine-Westphalia